The following is a list of critics of the New Deal.

From the Left (Liberals to far left)
 Mary van Kleeck, American social feminist, labor activist, and social scientist
 Huey Long. Governor and senator from Louisiana; supported Roosevelt in 1932; broke and was setting up a presidential campaign on the left in 1936
 William Lemke, North Dakota, Picked up Huey Long support in 1936
 Norman Thomas, frequent presidential candidate on the Socialist ticket. Disagreed with Roosevelt’s economic theory.
 John L. Lewis, leader of Mineworkers and CIO; strong supporter of Roosevelt in 1936; in opposition 1940 because of Roosevelt's foreign-policy opposing Germany

From the Right (Conservatives, libertarians, etc.)

Politicians
 John Nance Garner, supported Roosevelt in 1932; elected vice president 1932 and 1936; broke with Roosevelt in 1937 over his court packing plan.
 Carter Glass, Senator from Virginia, came from his death bed to the 1940 Democratic Convention to nominate Franklin Roosevelt's campaign manager James Farley as the Democratic Party's candidate for the Presidency. Glass was against Roosevelt's third term candidacy.
 William Randolph Hearst, former leader of left-wing of Democratic party; owned nation's largest newspaper chain; major supporter of Roosevelt in 1932, broke with Roosevelt in 1935 over Roosevelt's proposal to greatly increase taxes on the inheritances of the wealthy, and to close several tax loopholes used by the wealthy to avoid paying taxes.
 Hugh S. Johnson, first head of the National Recovery Administration see . Johnson fell out with Roosevelt after Roosevelt fired him in 1935.
 George N. Peek, farm leader; supported Roosevelt in 1932
 Al Smith, Democratic nominee for U.S. president in 1928; founded American Liberty League in 1934 to attack New Deal programs as fostering unnecessary "class conflict".
 Rush D. Holt, Sr., Democratic West Virginian Senator; opposed Roosevelt's domestic and foreign policies.
 Robert A. Taft, powerful Republican Senator from Ohio from 1939 to 1953. Taft was the leader of the Republican Party's conservative wing; he consistently denounced the New Deal as "socialism" and argued that it harmed America's business interests and gave ever-greater control to the central government in Washington. Before the Japanese attack on Pearl Harbor Taft, a non-interventionist, vigorously opposed Roosevelt's attempts to aid Britain in World War II.
 Ronald Reagan, Hollywood film actor; strong New Dealer in 1940s; started opposing New Deal programs in the 1950s as a spokesman for the General Electric company; would later become President of the United States in 1980.
 Lewis Douglas, Budget Director, 1933
 Harry F. Byrd, Democratic Senator from Virginia
 Frank Knox, Republican Vice Presidential candidate in 1936; joined Roosevelt's cabinet as Secretary of the Navy, 1940–44
 Henry Stimson, Hoover's Secretary of State; joined Roosevelt's cabinet as Secretary of War, 1940–45
 Wendell Willkie, Republican presidential candidate in 1940; supported Roosevelt 1941–43

Writers and speakers

 Maxwell Anderson, Playwright, American Libertarian, wrote Knickerbocker Holiday (with Kurt Weill) as a satire on the New Deal which compared Roosevelt to Hitler and Mussolini.
 Charles Coughlin, Irish-American Catholic priest with huge radio audience; anti-communist, originally on the left and a Roosevelt supporter in 1932 but by 1935 Coughlin "excoriated Roosevelt as 'anti-God'". Charles Coughlin denounced Roosevelt as too moderate and demanded stronger measures against "capitalism" which he associated with "Jews".
 Elizabeth Dilling, anti-communist activist, author of The Roosevelt Red Record and Its Background (1936)
 John Dos Passos, novelist; formerly on the left
 John T. Flynn, journalist, author of The Roosevelt Myth; formerly on the left
 Milton Friedman, economist. A spokesman for the Treasury during World War II; while supportive of relief and employment efforts and expansive monetary policy under the New Deal, Friedman was also critical of the National Recovery Administration.
 Robert Frost, poet
 Garet Garrett, editorial writer for Saturday Evening Post
 Henry Hazlitt, writer
 Robinson Jeffers, poet and playwright 
 Alice Lee Jemison, Native American rights advocate
 Rose Wilder Lane, novelist and journalist
 David Lawrence, magazine columnist
 Walter Lippmann newspaper columnist and political philosopher
 H.L. Mencken, American journalist, essayist, magazine editor
 Raymond Moley, former top Brain Truster
 Albert Jay Nock, libertarian author and social critic
 Isabel Paterson, libertarian author
 Westbrook Pegler newspaper columnist
 Ezra Pound, American poet and expatriate; radio broadcaster for Italian leader Benito Mussolini in World War II
 Ayn Rand novelist, founder of Objectivism and one inspiration for libertarianism.
 John R. Rice, Protestant fundamentalist writer.
 Gerald L. K. Smith, Huey Long second-in-command; took over "SOWM" after Long's death, went in pro-Nazi direction
 Gertrude Stein, novelist, poet, playwright
 Mark Sullivan, newspaper columnist
 James True 
 DeWitt Wallace, journalist and publisher of Reader's Digest

Books with an anti-New Deal point of view
 Alfred M. Bingham & Selden Rodman, editors, Challenge to the New Deal (1934)
Elizabeth Dilling, The Red Network (1934)
 Elizabeth Dilling, The Roosevelt Red Record and Its Background (1936)
 Herbert Hoover, Addresses Upon the American Road, 1933–1938 (1938)
 Raymond Moley, After Seven Years (1939)
 Herbert Hoover, Addresses Upon the American Road, 1940–1941 (1941)
 Thomas Jefferson Coolidge, Why Centralized Government (1941)
 John T. Flynn, The Roosevelt Myth (1948, revised 1952)
 Garet Garrett, The People's Pottage (1951, later republished as Burden of Empire and Ex America)
 Murray Rothbard, America's Great Depression. (1963)
 James J. Martin, American Liberalism and World Politics, 1931–1941 (1964)
 Garet Garrett, Salvos Against the New Deal: Selections from the Saturday Evening Post, 1933–1940 (2002), edited by Bruce Ramsey
 Thomas Fleming, The New Dealers' War: FDR and the War Within World War II (2002)
 Garet Garrett, Defend America First: The Antiwar Editorials of the Saturday Evening Post, 1939–1942 (2003), edited by Bruce Ramsey
 Jim Powell, FDR's Folly: How Roosevelt and His New Deal Prolonged the Great Depression (2003)
 Gene Smiley, Rethinking the Great Depression (2003)
 Thomas Woods, The Politically Incorrect Guide to American History (2004)
 Robert P. Murphy, The Politically Incorrect Guide to Capitalism (2007)
 Amity Shlaes, The Forgotten Man: A New History of the Great Depression (2007)
 Jonah Goldberg, Liberal Fascism: The Secret History of the American Left, from Mussolini to the Politics of Meaning (2008)
 Burton W. Folsom, Jr., New Deal or Raw Deal?: How FDR's Economic Legacy Has Damaged America (2008)
 Robert P. Murphy, The Politically Incorrect Guide to the Great Depression and the New Deal (2009)

See also

 Old Right (United States)
 Criticism of Franklin D. Roosevelt

References

Other references
 Gary Dean Best; The Critical Press and the New Deal: The Press Versus Presidential Power, 1933–1938 Praeger Publishers 1993. online edition
 Brinkley, Alan. Voices of Protest: Huey Long, Father Coughlin, & the Great Depression (1983)
 Graham, Otis L. and Meghan Robinson Wander, eds. Franklin D. Roosevelt: His Life and Times. (1985), an encyclopedia
 Kennedy, David M. Freedom From Fear: The American People in Depression and War, 1929–1945. (1999) the best recent scholarly narrative.
 McCoy, Donald * R. Landon of Kansas (1966) standard scholarly biography
 Paterson, James. Mr. Republican: A Biography of Robert Taft (1972), standard biography
 Ronald Radosh. Prophets on the Right: Profiles of conservative critics of American globalism (1978)
 Schlesinger, Arthur M. Jr., The Age of Roosevelt, 3 vols, (1957–1960), the classic pro-New Deal history, with details on critics. Online at vol 2 vol 3
 Rudolf, Frederick. "The American Liberty League, 1934–1940," American Historical Review, LVI (October 1950), 19–33 online at JSTOR
 Smith, Richard Norton. An Uncommon Man: The Triumph of Herbert Hoover (1987) biography
 White, Graham J. FDR and the Press. 1979.
 Winfield, Betty Houchin. FDR and the News Media 1990
 Williams, T. Harry. Huey Long (1969), Pulitzer Prize biography
 Wolfskill, George. The Revolt of the Conservatives: A History of the American Liberty League, 1934–1940 (1962)
 Anna Peterpants.  Thesis Statement on the Depression-Era Programs  (1951)
Brandon Streaker.  The Man and the Deal  (1964)
 Carl McCarthy.  The Great Wisconsin Brainwash  (1954)

New Deal
Old Right (United States)
New Deal
Conservatism-related lists